Philip Mayaka (born 30 November 2000) is a Kenyan footballer who plays as a midfielder for Crown Legacy in the MLS Next Pro.

Career

Youth 
Mayaka was scouted playing football in his local Nairobi by the general manager of the Montverde Academy in Florida. Mayaka had options to play in Norway, but opted to make the move to the United States. Whilst in Florida, Mayaka ended up playing with the Orlando City academy in the USSDA for a year, making 16 appearances and scoring 9 goals.

College 
In 2019, Mayaka attended Clemson University to play college soccer. In his two seasons with the Tigers, Mayaka made 32 appearances, scoring 2 goals and tallying 8 assists. In his freshman season, Mayaka was named ACC Freshman of the Year, All-ACC First Team, All-America Second Team and a semi-finalist for the MAC Hermann Trophy. His sophomore season saw Mayaka earn First-team All-ACC and
ACC All-Tournament team accolades.

Professional 
On 14 January 2021, it was announced Mayaka had left college early to sign a Generation Adidas deal with MLS, which would see him enter the 2021 MLS SuperDraft. Going in to the draft, Mayaka was considered the consenus number one pick, however was selected 3rd overall on 21 January 2021 by Colorado Rapids.

On 29 March 2021, Mayaka joined Colorado's USL Championship affiliate side Colorado Springs Switchbacks on loan. He made his professional debut on 14 May 2021, appearing as a 73rd-minute substitute during a 4–0 win over Sporting Kansas City II.

On November 10, 2022, his contract option was declined by Colorado.

Mayaka signed with Charlotte FC's MLS Next Pro side Crown Legacy in January 2023.

References

External links
 Clemson profile
 
 

2000 births
Association football midfielders
Clemson Tigers men's soccer players
Colorado Rapids draft picks
Colorado Rapids players
Colorado Springs Switchbacks FC players
Expatriate soccer players in the United States
Kenyan footballers
Kenyan expatriate footballers
Kenyan expatriate sportspeople in the United States
Living people
Montverde Academy alumni
Sportspeople from Nairobi
USL Championship players
Colorado Rapids 2 players
MLS Next Pro players